Craven is a surname that can be of English or Irish origin. In England, it is a topographical surname associated with the medieval kingdom or shire of Craven situated in west and north Yorkshire. In Ireland, Craven is the anglicisation of o'Crabhain, the descendant of Crabhan, a sept associated with the Ui  tribe of Connaught, Ireland.

Craven is the surname of:

 Avery Craven (1885–1980), American historian
 Beverley Craven (born 1963), British singer and songwriter
 Danie Craven (1910–1993), South African rugby union player, national coach, rugby administrator, academic and author
 Danny Craven (born 1967), former Australian rules footballer
 Danny Craven (rugby league) (born 1991), English rugby league player
 Dave Craven (born  1990), American politician
 Elizabeth Craven (née Berkeley; 1750—1828),  British author and playwright
 Frank Craven (1875-1945), American stage and film actor, playwright, and screenwriter
 Greg Craven (academic) (born 1958), Vice-Chancellor of the Australian Catholic University
 Greg Craven (teacher), climate change activist known for a YouTube viral video
 Henry Thornton Craven (1818–1905), English actor and dramatist
 Joan Craven (1897–1979), English photographer
 James Craven (disambiguation)
 John Craven (disambiguation)
 Joseph Craven (disambiguation)
 Kyle Craven (born 1989), American internet celebrity 
 Lyndley Craven (1945–2014), Australian botanist
 M. W. Craven, English crime writer, winner of the 2019 Gold Dagger award
 Margaret Craven (politician) (born 1944), American state senator in Maine
 Margaret Craven (writer) (1901–1980), American author
 Matt Craven (born 1956), Canadian actor
 Murray Craven (born 1964), Canadian ice hockey player
 Peter Craven (1934–1963), English motorcycle racer
 Peter Craven (literary critic), Australian writer
 Philip Craven (born 1950), British sports administrator, president of the International Paralympic Committee 
 Ricky Craven (born 1966), American NASCAR driver
 Robert Craven (born 1955), American politician
 Thomas Tingey Craven (rear admiral) (1808–1887), United States Navy officer who served in the Civil War
 Thomas Tingey Craven (US Navy admiral) (1873–1950), United States Navy officer who served in World Wars I and II, grandson of the above 
 Tunis Craven (1813–1864), United States Navy officer, brother of Thomas Tingey Craven
 T.A.M. Craven (1893–1972), United States Navy officer and FCC commissioner
 Wes Craven (1939–2015), American film director
 William Craven (disambiguation)

English-language surnames
English toponymic surnames